Nothris congressariella is a moth in the family Gelechiidae. It was described by Charles Théophile Bruand d'Uzelle in 1858. It is found in Great Britain, Portugal, Spain, France, Switzerland, Italy, North Macedonia, Greece, and on Crete, Sardinia, Sicily and the Canary Islands.

References

Chelariini
Moths described in 1858
Moths of Europe